Trichogramma brassicae is a species of parasitoid wasps from the Trichogrammatidae family. It mainly parasitizes Lepidopteran hosts in agricultural fields. They are entomaphagous parasitoids that deposit their own eggs inside the host's eggs, consuming the host egg material and emerging upon full development. They are a common biological control species that have been used commercially since the late 1970s. Inundative releases of T. brassicae, recently, can be done by means of drones and integrated control with Bacillus thuringiensis subs. kurstaki were demonstrated effective as chemical insecticide treatments and of course without negative environmental side effects.

References 

 Burgio G., Maini S., 1995.- Control of European corn borer in sweet corn by Trichogramma brassicae Bezd. (Hym., Trichogrammatidae).- Journal of Applied Entomology, 119 (1): 83–87.
Magagnoli S.,Lanzoni A., Masetti A., Depalo L., Albertini M., Ferrari R., Spadola G., Degola F., Restivo F. M., 
Burgio G.- 2021  Sustainability of strategies for Ostrinia nubilalis management in Northern Italy: Potential impact on beneficial arthropods and aflatoxin
contamination in years with different meteorological conditions, Crop protection, 142, 105529

Trichogrammatidae
Insects used as insect pest control agents
Biological pest control wasps
Insects described in 1833